St. Joseph's Healthcare Hamilton is a 777-bed academic health science centre in Hamilton, Ontario, Canada that is affiliated with the Michael G. DeGroote School of Medicine of McMaster University as well as Mohawk College. It is part of the St. Joseph's Health System and serves as the regional kidney transplant centre for a population of approximately 1.2 million people.

With three locations in Hamilton, the hospital is known for being one of the top national institutions for robotic surgery and for having one of the largest kidney and urinary programs. It's also first in Canada to partner a mental health worker with police to respond to a 911 crisis call.

Other services include acute care, surgical and outpatient services at three locations.

Locations

Charlton Campus
Location: 
St. Joseph's Healthcare Hamilton's Charlton campus is a busy, acute care centre that includes facilities such as the Firestone Institute for Respiratory Health, Centre for Minimal Access Surgery, and the Father Sean O'Sullivan Research Centre. This location has 600 beds.

West 5th Campus

Location: 
St. Joseph's Healthcare Hamilton's West 5th Campus provides specialized tertiary mental health services for residents of Central South Region in Ontario, operating specialized mental health beds and providing leading-edge community services to thousands of outpatients.

The West 5th Campus recently underwent a major redevelopment. Construction began in January 2011 and the new building was completed in the summer of 2014. The new facility is approximately 800,000 square feet.

In 2019, the facility provided inpatient and outpatient care to those suffering with a severe mental illness or addiction, and more general medical outpatient clinics plus diagnostic imaging services. This campus is also known as the Margaret and Charles Juravinski Centre for Integrated Healthcare.

King Campus
Location: 
St. Joseph's Healthcare Hamilton's King Campus is a stand-alone facility that has pioneered models of ambulatory care and includes a robust Surgery Centre for cataract surgeries and a satellite dialysis centre. The Regional Eye Institute (providing eye care and cataract surgery) is located here; the site is primarily for outpatient services, including pain management, a Mature Women's Health Centre, a 39-bed satellite Dialysis Clinic, and education programs.

Programs

Bariatric Surgery
Cancer Care
Chest
Complex Care
Critical Care / ICU
Diabetes
Diagnostic Imaging
Emergency and Urgent Care
Emergency Preparedness 
Family Medicine
Gastroenterology
General Internal Medicine
Kidney and Urinary Program
Laboratory Medicine
Mental Health and Addictions Program
Outpatient
Orthopedics
Rehabilitation
Surgery
Women and Infants Care

References

External links
St. Joseph's Healthcare Hamilton

Hospitals in Hamilton, Ontario